John Morgan (died 1 May 1504) was a medieval priest in England and Wales.

Morgan was educated at the University of Oxford, graduating LL.D. He was Dean of Windsor from 1484 to 1496; and Bishop of St Davids from 1496 until his death in 1504.

Citations

References

1504 deaths
Carmelites
Deans of Windsor
Bishops of St Davids
15th-century English Roman Catholic bishops
16th-century English Roman Catholic bishops
Year of birth unknown
Alumni of the University of Oxford